Gatcombe is a village in the civil parish of Chillerton and Gatcombe, on the Isle of Wight, England. It is located about two and a half miles south of Newport, in the centre of the island. The parish, which includes Chillerton, had a population of 422 at the 2011 census.

History and amenities
The parish church of St Olave's was dedicated in 1292, serving as a chapel to Gatcombe House and is a grade I listed building. Gatcombe parish was established in 1560. The civil parish was renamed from "Gatcombe" to "Chillerton and Gatcombe" in April 2013. The church contains stained glass of 1865–66 by William Morris, Dante Gabriel Rossetti, Ford Madox Brown and Edward Burne-Jones; a monument by Sir Thomas Brock to Captain Charles Grant Seely (killed 1917), unveiled in 1922; and a carved wooden effigy of medieval or early modern date around which various legends have developed.

In 1907, a contract was signed that ensured that properties older than 1907 in Gatcombe and nearby Chillerton would receive free water, while newer homes receive it at a reduced rate. In 2009 Southern Water proposed that all households should pay the same rate, claiming that the reasoning behind the initial pact is now invalid, as the costs for the original project have since been paid off.

Public transport is provided by Southern Vectis, which runs a line between Newport and Ventnor.

Gallery

References

External links

St Olave's Church, Gatcombe, Isle of Wight, Kent Collins, Roughwood website,  4 October 2002

Villages on the Isle of Wight